Commodore John Barry is a bronze statue of John Barry, sculpted by John Boyle and designed by architect Edward Pearce Casey.

It is located at Franklin Square (Washington, D.C.), 14th Street and K Street N.W. Washington, D.C.
It was dedicated on May 16, 1914.

The inscription reads:
(Base, south face:)
J.J. Boyle 
(Base, front:)

(Base, east face:)
John J. Boyle
Sculptor
Edward P. Casey Architect

As part of American Revolution Statuary in Washington, D.C. the statue is listed on the National Register of Historic Places.

See also
 List of public art in Washington, D.C., Ward 2

References

External links
 

Bronze sculptures in Washington, D.C.
1914 sculptures
Historic district contributing properties in Washington, D.C.
Barry
1914 establishments in Washington, D.C.
Downtown (Washington, D.C.)